Jane Salumäe (born 17 January 1968, in Tallinn) is a retired female long-distance runner from Estonia, who twice competed in the Summer Olympics (1996 and 2004).

Biography
She set her personal best (2:27:04) in the marathon on May 11, 1997 in Turin.

Achievements

References

External links

1968 births
Living people
Estonian female long-distance runners
Athletes (track and field) at the 1996 Summer Olympics
Athletes (track and field) at the 2004 Summer Olympics
Olympic athletes of Estonia
Athletes from Tallinn
Estonian female marathon runners
World Athletics Championships athletes for Estonia